Viive Rosenberg (née Viive Aadusoo; born 12 February 1943 in Kambja, Tartu County) is an Estonian agricultural scientist and politician. She was a member of IX Riigikogu.

She has been a member of Estonian Centre Party.

References

Living people
1943 births
Estonian women scientists
Estonian Centre Party politicians
Members of the Riigikogu, 1999–2003
Members of the Riigikogu, 2003–2007
Women members of the Riigikogu
Estonian University of Life Sciences alumni
People from Kambja Parish
21st-century Estonian women politicians